The 2013 North Carolina Tar Heels baseball team are representing the University of North Carolina at Chapel Hill in the 2013 NCAA Division I baseball season. Head Coach Mike Fox is in his 15th year coaching the Tar Heels. They play their home games at Bryson Field at Boshamer Stadium and are members of the Atlantic Coast Conference.

The 2013 season was one of the best in school history.  The Tar Heels were ranked #1 in the Baseball America poll for most of the season, and won their first ACC tournament title in six years.  They made the 2013 NCAA Division I baseball tournament as the overall number-one seed, and advanced to the 2013 College World Series.  It was the 10th CWS appearance in school history, and their seventh appearance since 2006.

Current roster

Schedule 

! style="background:#56A0D3;color:white;"| Regular Season
|- valign="top" 

|- bgcolor="#ccffcc"
| February 15 ||  || 1 || Bryson Field at Boshamer Stadium || 1–0 || K. Emanuel (1–0)||J. Prosinski (0–1)|| None || 2,352 || 1–0 || –
|- bgcolor="#CCCCCC"
| February 16 || Seton Hall || 1 || Boshamer Stadium || colspan=7|Cancelled due to weather
|- bgcolor="#ccffcc"
| February 17 || Seton Hall || 1 || Boshamer Stadium || 17–2 ||B. Moss (1–0)||B. Gilbert (0–1)||None|| 672 || 2–0 || –
|- bgcolor="#ccffcc"
| February 18 ||  || 1 || Boshamer Stadium || 7–1 || C. McCue (1–0)||T. Poole (0–1)|| None || 505 || 3–0 || –
|- bgcolor="#ccffcc"
| February 23 ||   || 1 || Boshamer Stadium || 11–2 || K. Emanuel (2–0)||B. McNitt (0–1)||None|| 310 || 4–0 || –
|- bgcolor="#ccffcc"
| February 24 || Stony Brook || 1 || Boshamer Stadium || 7–1 ||B. Moss (2–0)||F. Vanderka (0–1)||None|| 840 || 5–0 || –
|- bgcolor="#ccffcc"
| February 24 || Stony Brook || 1 || Boshamer Stadium || 9–8 ||S. Taylor (1–0)||T. Honahan (0–1)|| None || 1,610 || 6–0 || –
|- bgcolor="#ccffcc"
| February 27 ||  || 1 || Boshamer Stadium || 18–5 || T. Thornton (1–0)||A. Katz (0–1)||None|| 699 || 7–0 || –
|-

|- bgcolor="#ccffcc"
| March 1 || #12  || 1 || Minute Maid Park  || 2–1 ||C. McCue (2–0)||Z. Lemond (0–1)||L. Paula(1)|| – || 8–0 || –
|- bgcolor="#ccffcc"
| March 2 ||  || 1 || Minute Maid Park || 11–5 || B. Moss (3–0)||J. Schulz (0–1)|| None || – || 9–0 || –
|- bgcolor="#ccffcc"
| March 3 || #30  || 1 || Minute Maid Park ||14–2(7) ||C. Munnelly (1–0) || R. Pineda (1–1) || None || – || 10–0 || –
|- bgcolor="#ccffcc"
| March 5 ||  || 1 || Boshamer Stadium || 10–2 || T. Thornton (2–0) || N. Neitzel (0–1)|| None || 159 || 11–0 || –
|- bgcolor="#ccffcc"
| March 8 || at * || 1 || Gene Hooks Field || 4–0 || K. Emanuel (3–0)||A. Stadler (3–1) || None || 788 || 12–0 || 1–0
|- bgcolor="#ccffcc"
| March 9 || at Wake Forest* || 1 || Gene Hooks Field || 20–6 || B. Moss (4–0) || M. Pirro (3–1) || None || 1,706 || 13–0 || 2–0
|- bgcolor="#ccffcc"
| March 10 || at Wake Forest* || 1 || Gene Hooks Field || 6–2 ||C. McCue (3–0)||J. Van Grouw (1–3)|| T. Kelley(1) || 1,412 || 14–0 || 3–0
|- bgcolor="#ccffcc"
| March 12 ||  || 1 || Boshamer Stadium || 12–0 || T. Thornton (3–0) || C. Scarborough (1–2) || None || 597 || 15–0 || 3–0
|- bgcolor="#ccffcc"
| March 13 ||  || 1 || Boshamer Stadium || 7–2 || S. Taylor (2–0) || R. Retz (1–1) || None || 449 || 16–0 || 3–0
|- bgcolor="#ffbbbb"
| March 15 || #29 * || 1 || Boshamer Stadium || 1–4 || C. Diaz (2–1) || K. Emanuel (3–1) || E. Nedeljkovic(2) || 1,435 || 16–1 || 3–1
|- bgcolor="#ccffcc"
| March 16 || #29 Miami (FL)* || 1 || Boshamer Stadium || 14–2 || B. Moss (5–0) || J. Salas (2–2) || None || 2,405 || 17–1 || 4–1
|- bgcolor="#ccffcc"
| March 17 || #29 Miami (FL)* || 1 || Boshamer Stadium || 4–1 || C. McCue (4–0) || A. Salcines (2–2) || None || 1,225 || 18–1 || 5–1
|- bgcolor="#ccffcc"
| March 19 ||  || 1 || Boshamer Stadium || 16–0 || T. Thornton (4–0) || K. Link (0–2) || None || 768 || 19–1 || 5–1
|- bgcolor="#ccffcc"
| March 23 || * || 1 || Boshamer Stadium || 11–0 || K. Emanuel (4–1) || E. Stevens (0–5) || None || 285 || 20–1 || 6–1
|- bgcolor="#ccffcc"
| March 23 || Boston College* || 1 || Boshamer Stadium || 5–2 || B. Moss (6–0) || A. Chin (1–5) || None || 317 || 21–1 || 7–1
|- bgcolor="#CCCCCC"
| March 24 || Boston College* || 1 || Boshamer Stadium || colspan=7|Cancelled due to weather
|- bgcolor="#ccffcc"
| March 26 || VCU || 1 || Boshamer Stadium || 3–2 (10) || C. McCue (5–0) || M. Lees (1–1) || None || 365 || 22–1 || 7–1
|- bgcolor="#ccffcc"
| March 27 ||  || 1 || Boshamer Stadium || 6–2 || T. Thornton (5–0) || J. Keels (0–1) || None || 506 || 23–1 || 7–1
|- bgcolor="#ccffcc"
| March 30 || Clemson* || 1 || Boshamer Stadium || 10–3 || K. Emanuel (5–1) || D. Gossett (3–2) || None || 3,945 || 24–1 || 8–1
|-

|- align="center" bgcolor="#cffcc"
| April 1 || Clemson* || 1 || Boshamer Stadium || 6–2 || T. Thornton (6–0) || C. Schmidt (2–1) || None || 1,522 || 25–1 || 9–1
|- align="center" bgcolor="#ffbbb"
|April 1 || Clemson* || 1 || Boshamer Stadium || 4–5 (11) || S. Firth (3–4) || C. O'Brien (0–1) || None || 3,205 || 25–2 || 9–2
|- bgcolor="#ccffcc"
|April 3 || at  || 1 || Brooks Field || 10–0 || C. Munnelly (2–0) || Tart (2–3) || None || 3,285 || 26–2 || 9–2
|- bgcolor="#ccffcc"
|April 5 || * || 1 || Boshamer Stadium || 12–4 || K. Emmanuel (6–1) || J. Reed (4–3) || None || 1,976 || 27–2 || 10–2
|- bgcolor="#ccffcc"
|April 6 || Maryland* || 1 || Boshamer Stadium || 5–3 || T. Parrish (1–0) || B. Kirkpatrick (3–4) || None || 2,945 || 28–2 || 11–2
|- bgcolor="#ccffcc"
|April 7 || Maryland* || 1 || Boshamer Stadium || 8–4 || T. Thornton (7–0) || J. Price (0–2) || None || 4,100 || 29–2 || 12–2
|- bgcolor="#ccffcc"
| April 9 || at  || 2 || Latham Park || 15–3 || C. Munnelly (3–0) || Webb (3–1) || None || 1.422 || 30–2 || 12–2
|- bgcolor="#ccffcc"
|April 10 || Liberty || 2 || Boshamer Stadium || 7–5 || T. Kelley (1–0) || R. Gray (0–1) || T. Parrish(1) || 365 || 31–2 || 12–2
|- bgcolor="#ccffcc"
| April 12 || at Virginia Tech* || 2 || English Field || 21–8 || K. Emmanuel (7–1) || B. Markey (3–3) || None || 2,981 || 32–2 || 13–2
|- bgcolor="#ccffcc"
| April 13 || at Virginia Tech* || 2 || English Field || 9–8 (10)|| T. Thornton (8–0)|| C. Labitan (0–3) || None || 2,811 || 33–2 || 14–2
|- bgcolor="#ccffcc"
| April 14 || at Virginia Tech* || 2 || English Field || 3–0 || H. Johnson (1–0) || D. Burke (5–3) || T. Parrish(2) || 2,723 || 34–2 || 15–2 
|- bgcolor="#ccffcc"
| April 16 || Coastal Carolina || 1 || Boshamer Stadium || 5–1 || C. Munnelly (4–0) || A. Kerr (2–1) || T. Thornton(2) || 1,021 || 35–2 || 15–2
|- bgcolor="#ccffcc"
| April 17 || Elon || 1 || Boshamer Stadium || 14–5 || T. Kelley (2–0) || Baker (0–2) || None || 1,095 || 36–2 || 15–2
|- bgcolor="#ccffcc"
| April 19 || * || 1 || Boshamer Stadium || 7–1 || K. Emmanuel (8–1) || D. Van Orden (2–5) || None || 2,027 || 37–2 || 16–2
|- bgcolor="#ccffcc"
| April 20 || Duke* || 1 || Boshamer Stadium || 4–1 ||B. Moss (7–0) || T. Swart (4–3) || T. Thornton(3) || 4,205 || 38–2 || 17–2
|- bgcolor="#ccffcc"
| April 21 || Duke* || 1 || Boshamer Stadium || 10–1 || H. Johnson (2–0) || R. Huber (5–4) || None || 4,255 || 39–2 || 18–2
|- align="center" bgcolor="#ffbbb"
| April 23 || UNC Wilmington || – || Boshamer Stadium || 8–9 || Secrest (2–0) || T. Thornton (8–1) || None || 1,203 || 39–3|| 18–2
|- bgcolor="#ccffcc"
| April 24 ||  || 1|| Boshamer Stadium || 10–2 || R. Hovis (1–0) || W. Hatley (1–2) || None || 1,149 || 40–3 || 18–2
|- bgcolor="#ccffcc"
| April 26 || at #9 NC State* || 1 || Doak Field || 7–1 || K. Emmanuel (9–1) || Wilkins (5–2) || None || 3,048 || 41–3 || 19–2
|- align="center" bgcolor="#ffbbb"
| April 27 || at #9 NC State* || 1 || Doak Field || 3–7 || Rodon (5–2) || B. Moss (7–1) || Orwig(1) || 3,123 || 41–4 || 19–3
|- bgcolor="#CCCCCC"
| April 28 || at #9 NC State* || 1 || Doak Field || colspan=7|Cancelled due to weather
|-

|- bgcolor="#ccffcc"
| May 1 || The Citadel || 2 || Boshamer Stadium || 13–0 || H. Johnson (3–0) || Livingston (4–1) || None || 925 || 42–4 || 19–3
|- bgcolor="#ccffcc"
| May 7 ||  || 2 || Boshamer Stadium || 9–5 || H. Johnson (4–0) || P Toohers (2–8) || T. Thornton(4) || 889 || 43–4 || 19–3
|- bgcolor="#ccffcc"
| May 8 || James Madison || 2 || Boshamer Stadium || 6–1 (6)|| C. Munnelly (5–0) || M. Church (4–2) || None || 1,208 || 44–4 || 19–3
|- align="center" bgcolor="#ffbbb"
| May 10 || at * || 2 || Russ Chandler Stadium || 4–5 || D. Palka (1–0) || K. Emmanuel (9–2) || None || 2,072 || 44–5 || 19–4
|- bgcolor="#ccffcc"
| May 11 || at Georgia Tech* || 2 || Russ Chandler Stadium || 3–1 || B. Moss (8–1) || D. Isaacs (4–5) || T. Thornton(5) || 2,211 || 45–5 || 20–4
|- align="center" bgcolor="#ffbbb"
| May 12 || at Georgia Tech* || 2 || Russ Chandler Stadium || 8–9 (11)|| Z. Evans (1–2) || M. McCullough (0–1) || None || 2,250 || 45–6 || 20–5
|- bgcolor="#ccffcc"
| May 14 ||  || 4 || Boshamer Stadium || 2–0 || R. Hovis (2–0) || Springs (2–3) || C. Munnelly(1) || 2,024 || 46–6 || 20–5
|- align="center" bgcolor="#ffbbb"
| May 16 || #7 Virginia* || 4 || Boshamer Stadium || 4–10 || B. Waddell (4–1) || K. Emanuel (9–3) || None || 3,095 || 46–7 || 20–6
|- bgcolor="#ccffcc"
| May 17 || #7 Virginia* || 4 || Boshamer Stadium || 8–5 || C. McGue (6–0) || K. Crockett (4–1) ||  T. Thornton(6) || 4,100 || 47–7 || 21–6
|- align="center" bgcolor="#ffbbb"
| May 18 || #7 Virginia* || 4 || Boshamer Stadium || 7–8 (11)|| Rosenberger (2–0) || C. McGue (6–1) || None || 4,100 || 47–8 || 21–7
|- bgcolor="#ccffcc"
| May 20 || #8 Florida State || 4 || Boshamer Stadium || 4–3 || T. Thornton (9–1) || J. Winston (1–1) || None || 1,235 || 48–8 || 21–7
|-

|-
! style="background:#56A0D3;color:white;"| Post-Season
|- valign="top" 

|- bgcolor="#ccffcc"
| May 23 || Miami || 4 || Durham Bulls Athletic Park || 10–0 || K. Emmanuel (10–3) || A. Suarez (3–5) || None || 3,492 || 1–0
|- bgcolor="#ccffcc"
| May 24 || Clemson || 4 || Durham Bulls Athletic Park || 12–7 (14) || R. Hovis (3–0) || S. Firth (6–4) || None || 5,447 || 2–0
|- bgcolor="#ccffcc"
| May 25 || N.C. State || 4 || Durham Bulls Athletic Park || 2–1 (18) || C. Munnelly (6–0) || C. Overman (1–1) || None || 11,392 || 3–0 
|- bgcolor="#ccffcc"
| May 26 || Virginia Tech || 4 || Durham Bulls Athletic Park || 4–1 || T. Cherry (1–0) || E. Campbell (2–4) || T. Kelley(2) || 8,697 || 4–0   
|-

|- bgcolor="#ccffcc"
| May 31 || Canisius || 4 || Boshamer Stadium || 6–3 || C. McCue (7–1) || G. Cortright (8–2) || T. Thornton(7) || 3,305 || 1–0
|- bgcolor="#ccffcc"
| June 1 || Towson || 4 || Boshamer Stadium || 8–5 || K. Emmanuel (11–3) || B. Gonnella (4–5) || T. Thornton(8) || 4,100 || 2–0
|- align="center" bgcolor="#ffbbb"
| June 2 || Florida Atlantic || 4 || Boshamer Stadium || 2–3 || T. Kelley (2–1) || M. Sylvestri (4–2) || H. Adams (18) || 4,100 || 2–1 
|- bgcolor="#ccffcc"
| June 3 || Florida Atlantic || 4 || Boshamer Stadium || 12–11 (13) || R. Hovis (4–0) || M. Sylvestri (4–3) || None || 3,517 || 3–1  
|-

|- bgcolor="#ccffcc"
| June 8 || South Carolina || 4 || Boshamer Stadium || 6–5 || T. Thornton (10–1) || T. Webb (3–3) || None || 4,355 || 1–0
|- align="center" bgcolor="#ffbbb"
| June 9 || South Carolina || 4 || Boshamer Stadium || 0–8 || H. Johnson (11–3) || J. Montgomery (6–1) || None || 4,365 || 1–1
|- bgcolor="#ccffcc"
| June 11 || South Carolina || 4 || Boshamer Stadium || 5–4 || T. Thornton (11–1) ||  A. Westmoreland (7–4) || K. Emmanuel (1)''' || 4,100 || 2–1 
|-

|-
| style="font-size:88%" | Rankings from USA TODAY/ESPN Top 25 coaches' baseball poll. Parenthesis indicate tournament seedings.
|-
| style="font-size:88%" | *ACC Conference games

Ranking movements

See also 
 North Carolina Tar Heels
 2013 NCAA Division I baseball season

References 

North Carolina Tar Heels
North Carolina Tar Heels baseball seasons
Atlantic Coast Conference baseball champion seasons
College World Series seasons
2013 NCAA Division I baseball tournament participants
North